The Burn It Down Tour was a headlining concert tour by American country music singer Jason Aldean held in the United States between May 2014 and August 2015. It began on May 1, 2014 in Roanoke, Virginia. Venues included four Major League Baseball stadiums: Citizens Bank Park, PNC Park, Nationals Park, and Great American Ball Park. Supporting acts included Florida Georgia Line and Tyler Farr, and Miranda Lambert at select venues.  In summer 2015, Aldean's tour merged with Kenny Chesney's The Big Revival Tour for ten stadium shows. The "Burn It Down Tour" has played to over one million people.

Concert synopsis
Aldean plays a good mix of songs from all six of his albums, with most being from his current album, Old Boots, New Dirt', and covers as well during the show. Periodically Aldean would go out towards the crowd and perform from there.

Set list

 "Hicktown"
 "My Kinda Party"
 "Tattoos on This Town"
 "Amarillo Sky"
 "Big Green Tractor"
 "Johnny Cash"
 "The Truth"
 "Take a Little Ride"
 "Fly Over States"
 "When She Says Baby"
 "1994" 
 "Night Train"
 "Don't You Wanna Stay" (with Kelly Clarkson video hologram)
 "The Only Way I Know" (with Florida Georgia Line)
"Heaven" (Bryan Adams cover)
 "Dirt Road Anthem"
 "Crazy Town"
Encore
  "She's Country"

Tour dates

Critical reception
Jerry Wofford of Tulsa World says that Aldean "started off strong, with lots of fire and pyrotechnics". The show went on to say that the show had a rock concert vibe and only Aldean's voice and the slide guitar were the only hits of a traditional country show. He did a good job with "mixing his sound and styles throughout his set, and a good job of mixing in songs from each of his six albums". Wofford went on to say that "Aldean knows how to put on a huge show."

References

External links
Aldean's Official Website

2014 concert tours
2015 concert tours
Jason Aldean concert tours